Formors may refer to:
 the Fomorians, a semi-divine race who inhabited Ireland in ancient times
 Formors (album), a 2005 album by the French Celtic black metal band Aes Dana